The following is a partial list of the "N" codes for Medical Subject Headings (MeSH), as defined by the United States National Library of Medicine (NLM).

This list continues the information at List of MeSH codes (N01). Codes following these are found at List of MeSH codes (N03). For other MeSH codes, see List of MeSH codes.

The source for this content is the set of 2006 MeSH Trees from the NLM.

– health care facilities, manpower, and services

– health facilities
  – academic medical centers
  – hospitals, teaching
  – hospitals, university
  – schools, medical
  – ambulatory care facilities
  – community health centers
  – substance abuse treatment centers
  – community mental health centers
  – child guidance clinics
  – maternal-child health centers
  –  hospital outpatient clinics
  – pain clinics
  – pain clinics
  – surgicenters
  – bed occupancy
  – biological specimen banks
  – blood banks
  – milk banks
  – sperm banks
  – tissue banks
  – bone banks
  – eye banks
  – birthing centers
  – dental facilities
  – dental clinics
  – dental offices
  –  dental laboratories
  – facility design and construction
  – building codes
  – hospital design and construction
  – fitness centers
  –  proprietary health facilities
  –  proprietary hospitals
  – health facility closure
  – health facility environment
  – patients' rooms
  – health facility merger
  – health facility moving
  – health facility size
  – hospital bed capacity
  –  under 100 hospital bed capacity
  –  100 to 299 hospital bed capacity
  –  300 to 499 hospital bed capacity
  –  500 and over hospital bed capacity
  – hospital administration
  –  hospital ancillary services
  – centralized hospital services
  –  hospital financial management
  – hospital communication systems
  – hospital departments
  –  hospital admitting department
  –  hospital anesthesia department
  –  hospital cardiology service
  –  hospital central supply
  –  hospital chaplaincy service
  –  hospital dental service
  –  hospital education department
  –  hospital emergency service
  – trauma centers
  –  hospital food service
  –  hospital housekeeping
  –  hospital laboratories
  –  hospital laundry service
  –  hospital maintenance and engineering
  –  hospital medical records department
  –  hospital nuclear medicine department
  –  hospital nursing service
  –  hospital obstetrics and gynecology department
  –  hospital occupational therapy department
  –  hospital oncology service
  –  hospital outpatient clinics
  – pain clinics
  –  hospital pathology department
  –  hospital personnel administration
  –  hospital pharmacy service
  –  hospital physical therapy department
  –  hospital psychiatric department
  –  hospital purchasing
  – group purchasing
  –  hospital radiology department
  –  hospital respiratory therapy department
  –  hospital social work department
  –  hospital surgery department
  –  hospital urology department
  – hospital distribution systems
  – hospital-patient relations
  – hospital-physician relations
  – medical staff privileges
  – hospital restructuring
  – hospital-physician joint ventures
  – physician self-referral
  – hospital shared services
  – hospital shops
  –  hospital libraries
  –  hospital materials management
  –  hospital inventories
  –  hospital medication systems
  – product line management
  – hospital units
  – delivery rooms
  –  hospital hemodialysis units
  – intensive care units
  – burn units
  – coronary care units
  –  pediatric intensive care units
  –  neonatal intensive care units
  – recovery room
  – respiratory care units
  – nurseries, hospital
  – operating rooms
  – self-care units
  – hospitals
  –  community hospitals
  –  general hospitals
  –  group practice hospitals
  –  packaged hospitals
  –  private hospitals
  –  proprietary hospitals
  –  religious hospitals
  –  voluntary hospitals
  –  public hospitals
  –  county hospitals
  –  district hospitals
  –  federal hospitals
  –  military hospitals
  –  veterans hospitals
  –  municipal hospitals
  –  state hospitals
  –  rural hospitals
  –  satellite hospitals
  –  special hospitals
  – cancer care facilities
  – cardiac care facilities
  – hospices
  –  chronic disease hospitals
  –  convalescent hospitals
  –  maternity hospitals
  – hospitals, osteopathic
  – hospitals, pediatric
  – hospitals, psychiatric
  – surgicenters
  –  teaching hospitals
  –  university hospitals
  –  urban hospitals
  –  municipal hospitals
  – laboratories
  –  hospital laboratories
  – leper colonies
  – medical office buildings
  – nurseries
  – nurseries, hospital
  – pharmacies
  – physicians' offices
  – poison control centers
  – rehabilitation centers
  – sheltered workshops
  – substance abuse treatment centers
  – residential facilities
  – assisted living facilities
  – group homes
  – halfway houses
  – homes for the aged
  – nursing homes
  – intermediate care facilities
  – skilled nursing facilities
  – orphanages

– health manpower

– health personnel
  – allied health personnel
  – animal technicians
  – community health aides
  – dental auxiliaries
  – dental assistants
  – dental hygienists
  – dental technicians
  – denturists
  – emergency medical technicians
  – home health aides
  – medical record administrators
  – medical secretaries
  – medical receptionists
  – nurses' aides
  – psychiatric aides
  – operating room technicians
  – pharmacists' aides
  – physician assistants
  – ophthalmic assistants
  – pediatric assistants
  – caregivers
  – coroners and medical examiners
  – dental staff
  – dental staff, hospital
  – dentists
  –  women dentists
  – faculty, dental
  – faculty, medical
  – faculty, nursing
  – health facility administrators
  – hospital administrators
  –  hospital chief executive officers
  – infection control practitioners
  – laboratory personnel
  – medical staff
  –  hospital medical staff
  – hospitalists
  – nurses
  – nurse administrators
  – nurse anesthetists
  – nurse clinicians
  – nurse midwives
  – nurse practitioners
  – nurses, male
  – nursing staff
  – nursing staff, hospital
  – personnel, hospital
  – dental staff, hospital
  – hospital administrators
  – chief executive officers, hospital
  – hospital volunteers
  – hospital auxiliaries
  – patient escort service
  – hospital medical staff
  – hospitalists
  –  hospital nursing staff
  – pharmacists
  – physician executives
  – physicians
  – foreign medical graduates
  – hospitalists
  – physicians, family
  –  women physicians
  – veterinarians

– health promotion
  – Healthy People programs

– health services
  – adolescent health services
  – child care
  – infant care
  –  neonatal intensive care
  – perinatal care
  – rooming-in care
  – community health services
  – child health services
  – early intervention (education)
  – community health nursing
  – community mental health services
  – community networks
  – community pharmacy services
  – consumer participation
  – patient participation
  – counseling
  – sex counseling
  – family planning services
  – foster home care
  – home care services
  –  home hemodialysis
  –  hospital-based home care services
  – home infusion therapy
  – home nursing
  – respite care
  – homemaker services
  –  home parenteral nutrition
  –  home total parenteral nutrition
  – hospices
  – maternal health services
  – postnatal care
  – preconception care
  – prenatal care
  – occupational health services
  – preventive health services
  – diagnostic services
  – mass screening
  – anonymous testing
  – genetic screening
  – mass chest x-ray
  – multiphasic screening
  – neonatal screening
  – mobile health units
  – early intervention (education)
  – health education
  –  dental health education
  – health fairs
  – patient education
  – immunization programs
  – mass immunization
  – needle-exchange programs
  – School Health Services
  – school dentistry
  – school nursing
  – dental health services
  – dental care
  – dental care for aged
  – dental care for children
  – dental care for chronically ill
  – dental care for disabled
  –  hospital dental service
  – dietary services
  –  hospital food service
  – menu planning
  – emergency medical services
  – emergency medical service communication systems
  –  hospital emergency service
  – trauma centers
  –  psychiatric emergency services
  – poison control centers
  – transportation of patients
  – ambulances
  – air ambulances
  – triage
  – genetic services
  – genetic counseling
  – genetic screening
  – health services for the aged
  –  indigenous health services
  – health services misuse
  – unnecessary procedures
  – medical errors
  – diagnostic errors
  – medication errors
  – observer variation
  – mental health services
  – community mental health services
  – counseling
  – directive counseling
  – sex counseling
  –  psychiatric social work
  – nursing care
  – emergency nursing
  – geriatric nursing
  – holistic nursing
  – home nursing
  – respite care
  – maternal-child nursing
  – neonatal nursing
  –  practical nursing
  – obstetrical nursing
  – occupational health nursing
  – oncologic nursing
  – orthopedic nursing
  – pediatric nursing
  – neonatal nursing
  – perioperative nursing
  – operating room nursing
  – postanesthesia nursing
  – primary nursing care
  – psychiatric nursing
  – rehabilitation nursing
  – nursing services
  – home care services
  –  hospital nursing service
  – patient care
  – aftercare
  – ambulatory care
  –  continuous ambulatory peritoneal dialysis
  – critical care
  – intensive care
  –  neonatal intensive care
  – custodial care
  – day care
  – episode of care
  – foster home care
  – hospitalization
  – length of stay
  – patient admission
  – patient discharge
  – patient readmission
  – patient transfer
  – institutionalization
  – deinstitutionalization
  – life support care
  – long-term care
  – night care
  – nursing care
  – home nursing
  – respite care
  – palliative care
  – perinatal care
  – perioperative care
  – intraoperative care
  – perioperative nursing
  – postoperative care
  – postnatal care
  – preconception care
  – prenatal care
  – preoperative care
  – subacute care
  – terminal care
  – euthanasia
  – active euthanasia
  – euthanasia, active, voluntary
  – animal euthanasia
  –  passive euthanasia
  – hospice care
  – resuscitation orders
  – assisted suicide
  – withholding treatment
  –  passive euthanasia
  – personal health services
  – pharmaceutical services
  – community pharmacy services
  – drug information services
  – adverse drug reaction reporting systems
  – clinical pharmacy information systems
  –  hospital pharmacy service
  – preventive health services
  – diagnostic services
  – mass screening
  – anonymous testing
  – mass chest x-ray
  – multiphasic screening
  – mobile health units
  – early intervention (education)
  – health education
  –  dental health education
  – health fairs
  – patient education
  – health promotion
  – Healthy People programs
  – immunization programs
  – mass immunization
  – needle-exchange programs
  – primary prevention
  – immunization
  – mass immunization
  – vaccination
  – school health services
  – school dentistry
  – school nursing
  – physical rehabilitation
  – activities of daily living
  –  vocational rehabilitation
  – supported employment
  – self care
  – reproductive health services
  – family planning services
  – maternal health services
  – rural health services
  – social work
  – psychiatric social work
  – student health services
  – suburban health services
  – tissue and organ procurement
  – directed tissue donation
  – donor selection
  – urban health services
  – women's health services
  – preconception care

– housekeeping
  – hospital housekeeping

– maintenance
  –  hospital maintenance and engineering

– missions and missionaries

The list continues at List of MeSH codes (N03).

N02